An elixir is a type of pharmaceutical preparation.

Elixir may also refer to:

Arts and media

Music
 Elixir (British band), a British heavy metal band
 Elixir (Australian band), an Australian jazz band
 Elixir (Elixir album), 2003
 Elixir Strings, an American maker of strings for stringed instruments
 Elixir (Iasos album), 1983
 Elixir (Fourplay album), 1994
 Elixir (Hal Russell album), 2001
 "Elixir", a song by Vast Aire

Other media
 Elixir (comics), a fictional mutant in the Marvel Universe
 Elixir (Duff and Allen novel), a novel by Hilary Duff and Elise Allen
 Elixir (Walters novel), a novel by Eric Walters
 Elixir (video game), a 1987 video game
 Elixir (film), a 2016 Bengali short film

Other uses
 ELIXIR, the European life-sciences infrastructure for biological information, a collaborative research network
 Elixir (perfume), a perfume by Shakira
 Elixir (programming language)
 Elixir Studios, a British video game developer
 Elixir Aircraft Elixir, a light aircraft design

See also
 Elixer, Missouri, a community in the United States
 Elixir of life, a legendary drink that grants eternal life or youth
 Elisir (disambiguation)